Lahiru is a given name. Notable people with the given name include:

Lahiru Fernando (born 1994), Sri Lankan cricketer
Lahiru Gamage (born 1988), Sri Lankan cricketer
Lahiru Jayakody (born 1994), Sri Lankan cricketer
Lahiru Jayaratne (born 1991), Sri Lankan cricketer
Lahiru Kumara (born 1997), Sri Lankan cricketer
Lahiru Madushanka (born 1992), Sri Lankan cricketer
Lahiru Milantha (born 1994), Sri Lankan cricketer
Lahiru Perera (born 1984), Sri Lankan singer, musician and music producer
Lahiru Samarakoon (born 1997), Sri Lankan cricketer
Lahiru Sandaruwan (born 1991), Sri Lankan cricketer
Lahiru Sri Lakmal (born 1989), Sri Lankan cricketer
Lahiru Thirimanne (born 1989), Sri Lankan cricketer
Lahiru Udara (born 1993), Sri Lankan cricketer
Lahiru Weragala (born 1989), Sri Lankan cricketer

Sinhalese masculine given names